Shuraih ibn al-Hârith  ibn Qays ibn al-Jahm al-Kindî (d. June 697/~80 Hijri) was a tābi‘ ( singular of Tabi'un ) who accepted Islam in Yemen during the lifetime of Muhammad though he never met him. During the reign of Abū Bakr al-Siddīq, he relocated to Kufah in Iraq. He served as a judge and was renowned for his justice and good judgement.

As judge
"Umar appointed him to be the judge of Kufah and he was very young at the time. Abû Nu`aym relates from Umm Dâwûd al-Wâbishiyyah that “people took their disputes before Shuraih at a time when he still had no beard.”

It is said that he spent sixty years in that office. He also served as judge in Basra for a year. He succeeded Abdullah ibn Masood as the Qadi of Kufa. He was well known throughout the  country for his intelligence and keen sense of judgment. He was regarded as a model judge. Ali used to  call him iiAqd-ul-Arabi, that is the most judicious of all the judges of Arabia.

Shuraih was known for his extensive knowledge of Islamic law and respected for his good judgment. The caliphs showed deference to him.

Caliph Mu`âwiyah then transferred him to Damascus. On account of this, Shuraih became known as “the Judge of the Two Great Cities”. He retired from office only a year before his death, and he is supposed to have lived to the age of 108 or 110.
It is related that,
"Alî assembled the people in the public square, saying: 'I am going to leave you, so assemble in the public square.' The people came and began to petition him with their questions until they were finished and no one remained but Shuraih, who sat upon his knees and began to ask him. `Alî said: “Go, for indeed you are the most knowledgeable of Arabs in matters of judicial verdicts.” [Hilyah al-Awliyâ’ (4/134)]

Once a woman came to `Alî with a case against her husband in a matter of divorce. After she presented her case to him, `Alî turned to Shuraih and said: “Judge between them.” Shuraih said: “O Commander of the Faithful! (Should I presume to do so) while you are right here?” `Alî repeated: “Judge between them.”

Shurayh was renowned for his impeccable sense of justice and for holding all people equal before the law.

About Shuraih's appointment as a judge, it is related that Umar purchased a horse on approval, and gave it to somebody to try it. The horse got hurt in the ride, and Umar wanted to return it, but the owner refused to take it back. In the dispute that arose as a consequence, Shuraih was chosen as the arbitrator. He gave the verdict that if the horse was ridden with the permission of the owner it could be returned; otherwise not. Umar said that that was the right decision and at once appointed Shuraih as the Qadi of Kufa.

Another well known incidence records Ali’s shield being stolen. Ali recognised his shield when he saw it in the possession of a Jew. He instituted a claim in the court of Qadhi Shuraih who asked that Ali produce his witnesses to prove his claim. Ali presented his son and then his emancipated slave. According to Qadhi Shuraih the testimony of a son in favour of his father or an emancipated slave was not admissible, hence he ordered Ali to present another witness. When Ali was unable to do so, Qadhi Shuraih dismissed his original claim to the shield. Ali, the caliph of the time, emerged from the court cheerfully.

On seeing this high degree of justice where the leader of the Muslim world could lose a case in the face of a just ruling, the Jew recited the Muslim testification of faith embraced Islam. He later presented the shield to Ali saying that he did indeed steal the shield and that it did belong to him. Ali responded: “I have made it a gift for you". Thereafter the Jew remained perpetually in the company of Ali and was martyred in the battle of Siffeen.

References

External links
 Good audio on Qadi Shureh

7th-century Arabs
697 deaths
Tabi‘un hadith narrators